The 2018 Massachusetts Senate election took place on November 6, 2018 to elect members of the Massachusetts Senate.

Qualifications 
The following are the qualifications to be elected to the Massachusetts Senate:
 Be at least eighteen years of age
 Be a registered voter in Massachusetts
 Be an inhabitant of Massachusetts for five years
 Be a resident of the district when elected
 Receive at least 300 signatures on nomination papers

Detailed results

1st Bristol and Plymouth District

Worcester and Middlesex District

Norfolk, Bristol and Middlesex District

See also 
 2018 Massachusetts general election
 2017–2018 Massachusetts legislature

References

External links 
 State Legislature

Senate 2018
Massachusetts Senate
State Senate